John Arthur Biller (November 14, 1877 in Newark, New Jersey – March 26, 1934 in Manhattan, New York) was an American athlete who competed mainly in standing jumps.

He competed for the United States in the 1904 Summer Olympics held in St Louis, United States in the standing long jump where he won the bronze medal. In the standing high jump he was 4th, and he also was 5th in the discus throw.  Four years later he medalled at the Olympics for a second time, this time he won the silver medal for the standing high jump and was 4th in the standing long jump in the 1908 Summer Olympics held in London, Great Britain.

References

External links
 
John Biller's profile at databaseOlympics

1877 births
1934 deaths
American male high jumpers
American male long jumpers
Olympic silver medalists for the United States in track and field
Olympic bronze medalists for the United States in track and field
Athletes (track and field) at the 1904 Summer Olympics
Athletes (track and field) at the 1908 Summer Olympics
Medalists at the 1908 Summer Olympics
Medalists at the 1904 Summer Olympics
Track and field athletes from New Jersey
American male discus throwers
20th-century American people